Christopher Meek is an American philanthropist and finance executive and author. Meek is the co-founder and chairman of SoldierStrong, a charitable organization which provides support for U.S. service members and veterans. He is also the co-founder and chairman of START Now!, a non-profit which provides foreclosure counseling to homeowners. He is also the managing director of global relationship management at S&P Global and a member of the Maxwell School Advisory Board at Syracuse University.

Education and career
In 1992, Meek graduated from Syracuse University with a Bachelor of Arts in economics and political science from the Maxwell School of Citizenship and Public Affairs. He has a Master of Business Administration degree from Pace University. 

Meek was an equity derivatives trader at Goldman Sachs for 16 years before stepping down as a vice president in the securities division in August 2011. As of 2023, he is the managing director of global relationship management at S&P Global.

Philanthropy

In April 2009, Meek held a mortgage modification event for homeowners and lenders at a Stamford, Connecticut community center. The event led to the founding of the foreclosure counseling non-profit START Now!. According to Meek, from April 2009 to March 2011, it has helped prevent foreclosures on 250 properties.

Meek also founded Soldier Socks (also called SoldierSocks, later renamed SoldierStrong) in 2009 after a conversation with a former U.S. Marine. It was created to help U.S. troops in Afghanistan and Iraq get access to essential hygiene items. By 2013, Soldier Socks had sent 73,000 pounds of hygiene items, and founded the Soldier Socks Veterans Grant Foundation. In 2013, it shifted fundraising efforts to meet the needs of returning veterans: it partnered with Ekso Bionics to develop a robotic exoskeleton to give paralyzed veterans the ability to walk again. As of December 2020, SoldierStrong has donated 29 exoskeleton suits to VA hospitals.

He also established veteran scholarship funds at the Syracuse University Maxwell School of Citizenship and Public Affairs, and the Walsh School of Foreign Service at Georgetown University and at Old Dominion University. 

On May 22, 2018, Meek testified in front of the U.S. House Subcommittees on Research and Technology and Energy on the topic of empowering U.S. veterans through technology.

Politics

In the summer of 2010, Meek was appointed to the Stamford Urban Redevelopment Commission. On November 17, 2011, Meek formally announced his candidacy to represent Connecticut's 4th congressional district. He ended his campaign on May 26, 2012, a week after he got 27% of the vote in the Republican state convention.

Books
Meek is the author of the book Next Steps Forward: Beyond Remembering (ISBN 979-8986020808) which was published in May 2022. He has also contributed to the book, Voices Against Trafficking: The Strength of Many Voices Speaking As One (ISBN 978-1733360524) which was published in December 2021.

Personal life
Meek is married with three children.

References

21st-century American businesspeople
Philanthropists from New York (state)
Living people
Syracuse University alumni
Pace University alumni
Connecticut Republicans
Year of birth missing (living people)